PP2 is a substance that has frequently been used in cancer research as a "selective" inhibitor for Src-family kinases. It strongly inhibits the kinases Lck (IC50=4 nM), Fyn (5 nM) and Hck (5 nM), shows weaker inhibition of EGFR (480 nM) and practically no inhibition of ZAP-70 (100 μM) and JAK2 (50 μM). Despite its extensive use as a Src-selective inhibitor, recent research has shown that PP2 is non-selective and inhibits many other kinases with similar affinities.

References

Protein kinase inhibitors
Pyrazolopyrimidines
Chloroarenes
Aromatic amines